is a former professional tennis player from Japan. She was born on May 1, 1968, in Japan and played on the WTA tour from 1986 to 1992. She reached the fourth round at Roland Garros in 1992, where she led the world number-one-ranked player Monica Seles 4 games to 1 in the final set. Seles won the match 6–4 in the third set. She retired with a 63–100 singles record.

WTA finals

Singles (0–2)

Doubles (0–1)

ITF finals

Singles (1–1)

Doubles (1–1)

References

External links
 
 

Japanese female tennis players
1968 births
Living people
People from Ebina, Kanagawa
Sportspeople from Kanagawa Prefecture
Asian Games medalists in tennis
Tennis players at the 1990 Asian Games
Medalists at the 1990 Asian Games
Asian Games gold medalists for Japan
Asian Games bronze medalists for Japan